"Mer av dig" is a song by Swedish singer Theoz, released as a single on 11 February 2023. It was performed in Melodifestivalen 2023.

Charts

References

2023 songs
2023 singles
Melodifestivalen songs of 2023
Songs written by Peter Boström
Songs written by Thomas G:son